Tom or Thomas Cahill may refer to:

Tom Cahill (American football) (1919–1992), American football coach at Army, 1966–1973
Tom Cahill (Australian politician) (1924–1983), member of New South Wales Legislative Assembly
Tom Cahill (baseball) (1868–1894), American Major League Baseball player
Tom Cahill (footballer, born 1931) (1931–2003), Scottish footballer
Tom Cahill (footballer, born 1986), English footballer
Thomas Cahill (1940–2022), American scholar and writer
Thomas Cahill (soccer) (1864–1951), American athlete, coach and businessman; a founding father of American soccer
Thomas J. Cahill (1910–2002), chief of police in San Francisco, California, 1958–1970
Thomas Cahill (bishop) (1913–1978), Australian archbishop of Canberra – Goulburn